Geoffrey Howard Parke-Taylor (1920  11 May 2009) was a Canadian professor in the fields of Old Testament and Hebrew at Wycliffe College, Anglican Theological College and Huron University College. He also was Dean of Theology at Huron University College.

Education 
Revel earned his Doctorate of Divinity with his thesis entitled Forensic and non-forensic elements in St. Paul's ideas of justification and righteousness, at Wycliffe College. He was awarded honorary doctorates from Trinity College and Huron College.

Awards 
In 2001 Parke-Taylor wins Scott Award with his book The Formation of the Book of Jeremiah: Doublets and Recurring Phrases, in which he identifies instances in which the same prophet wrote the book.
Doctor honoris causa at Trinity College and at Huron University.

Bibliography

Thesis

Books

References

External links 
Photograph of G. H. Parke-Taylor

1920 births
2009 deaths
Academic staff of the University of Toronto
Academic staff of the University of Western Ontario